Boyer is an unincorporated community in Crawford County, in the U.S. state of Iowa.

History

Boyer was laid out in 1889. The community took its name from the Boyer River. Boyer's population was 60 in 1902, and 80 in 1925.

A post office called Boyer was established in 1899, and remained in operation until it was discontinued in 1967.

References

Unincorporated communities in Crawford County, Iowa
Unincorporated communities in Iowa